Orjuwan is an upscale restaurant and nightclub in Ramallah.

Orjuwan is located in the "fashionable" Ramallah neighborhood of Al-Masyoun.  The restaurant was opened in 2009 by two brothers and a sister from the well-known Sakakini family, Sari, Salim; their sister, Katia.  It offers an Italian-Palestinian fusion cuisine.

Co-owner Sari Sakakini  told the New York Times, “We wanted to make five-star gourmet Palestinian food.”  The restaurant's Italian-trained chefs, Iad Abu Khlaf and Samer Jadoun, are particularly proud of their fusion risottos.  Their  risotto al maklouba, is made with cauliflower, eggplant and spices.

References

Restaurants in Ramallah
Restaurants established in 2009
2009 establishments in the Palestinian territories
Nightclubs
Italian restaurants